Gusev (masculine) or Guseva (feminine) is the name of several inhabited localities in Russia.

Modern localities
Urban localities
Gusev, Kaliningrad Oblast, a town in Gusevsky District of Kaliningrad Oblast

Rural localities
Gusev, Belgorod Oblast, a khutor in Grushevsky Rural Okrug of Volokonovsky District in Belgorod Oblast
Gusev, Dmitrovsky District, Oryol Oblast, a settlement in Borodinsky Selsoviet of Dmitrovsky District in Oryol Oblast
Gusev, Korsakovsky District, Oryol Oblast, a settlement in Paramonovsky Selsoviet of Korsakovsky District in Oryol Oblast
Gusev, Chertkovsky District, Rostov Oblast, a khutor in Mankovskoye Rural Settlement of Chertkovsky District in Rostov Oblast
Gusev, Kamensky District, Rostov Oblast, a khutor in Gusevskoye Rural Settlement of Kamensky District in Rostov Oblast
Guseva, Irkutsk Oblast, a farmstead in Cheremkhovsky District of Irkutsk Oblast
Guseva, Sverdlovsk Oblast, a village in Malobrusyansky Selsoviet of Beloyarsky District in Sverdlovsk Oblast

Alternative names
Gusev, alternative name of Gusevo, a village in Bolsheorshinsky Rural Okrug of Orshansky District in the Mari El Republic; 
Guseva, alternative name of Gusevo, a village in Yaropoletskoye Rural Settlement of Volokolamsky District in Moscow Oblast;